Vjosa Osmani-Sadriu (born 17 May 1982) is a Kosovar Albanian jurist and politician serving as the 5th and current President of Kosovo since 4 April 2021.

Born in Kosovo and raised in the city of Mitrovica, Osmani became a political activist and studied law at the University of Pristina and the University of Pittsburgh School of Law. She worked as an advisor to the then president of Kosovo Fatmir Sejdiu before she was elected to the Assembly. Osmani held the position of Speaker of the Assembly from February 2020 to March 2021, and also served as acting president between November 2020 and March 2021 after the resignation of President Hashim Thaçi. Upon her election as president, Osmani became the second woman to hold the position, as well as the first person to have served as both acting president and president of Kosovo.

Osmani successfully ran on an anti-corruption platform and has expressed a desire to normalize relations between Kosovo and Serbia. Since taking office, Osmani has returned the flag of Dardania as the official symbol of the presidency.

Early life and education 
She grew up with four siblings, and completed her primary and secondary education in her hometown. Osmani was a teenager during the Kosovo War, and she once stated that she "can still feel" the barrel of an AK-47 rifle that a soldier forced into her mouth after her home in Mitrovica had been raided.

Osmani earned her bachelor's degree in law from the University of Prishtina in Kosovo. She continued with graduate studies at the University of Pittsburgh School of Law (Pitt Law), earning a master's degree in law (LLM) in 2005 and a doctorate in juridical science (SJD) in 2015. Her doctoral dissertation addressed the applicability of the UN Convention on Contracts for the International Sale of Goods (CISG) in Kosovo as Kosovo's legal status has evolved since 1988, when the CISG first entered into force.

Career

Academia 
Osmani has been a teaching assistant at the  University of Pristina, a lecturer at RIT Kosovo, and a visiting professor at the University of Pittsburgh.

Politics 

Osmani's political career began in her teens, as an activist for the centre-right Democratic League of Kosovo (LDK). On 27 August 2009, she was elected chief of staff for then president Fatmir Sejdiu. Osmani had also served as legal counsel and foreign policy advisor to the president. She was a member of the Assembly of Kosovo for three terms, and once received the largest number of votes for a female politician in Kosovan parliamentary history.

Osmani contributed to the independence of Kosovo, as the president's representative for the Constitution Commission, the body that prepared the Kosovan constitution. She represented Kosovo in a case at the International Court of Justice, where she defended the legality of Kosovo's independence.

As part of her parliamentary duties, Osmani served as the chair of the Committee on Foreign Affairs, Diaspora and Strategic Investments and the Committee on European Integration. She also served as the vice-chair of the Committee on Constitutional Reforms in Kosovo.

In 2014, Osmani clashed with LDK leadership, including party leader Isa Mustafa, when she criticized the LDK for forming a coalition government with its long-time rival party, the Democratic Party of Kosovo (PDK), breaking a previously made pledge. Osmani also boycotted the presidential election in 2016, in which PDK leader Hashim Thaçi was elected president as part of the coalition agreement.

2019 election 

Osmani was viewed as a possible prime minister of Kosovo by the LDK in the 2019 snap parliamentary election. While campaigning for the election, she said the Kosovan people were ready for a female prime minister, and that she could fight corruption and make free market reforms for Kosovo. She lost the election to Albin Kurti, leader of the left-wing anti-establishment party Vetëvendosje, and had received 176,016 votes.

On , Osmani was removed from her position as her party's deputy leader, after LDK leader Mustafa called for her dismissal due to her public opposition of decisions made by the party. Prime Minister Avdullah Hoti replaced her as LDK deputy leader.

Acting presidency 
In 2020, Osmani was appointed acting president of Kosovo after President Thaçi resigned following an indictment by the Kosovo Specialist Chambers and Specialist Prosecutor's Office in The Hague.

She also aligned with Kurti's Vetëvendosje party. Running on an anti-corruption platform, both parties scored landslide victories, and Osmani personally received more than 300,000 votes. The election also gave women a third of the 120-seat parliament and an unprecedented six positions out of fifteen in the cabinet.

In contrast, the LDK, Osmani's former party, did very poorly in the elections, as predicted by LDK members who had publicly criticized the earlier ouster of Osmani in 2020.

Presidency 

On , the assembly elected Osmani as Kosovo's president during its third round of voting. Although the vote was unattended by two opposition parties as well as a party representing the ethnic Serb minority in Kosovo, 82 members of the 120-seat parliament cast their votes during the second day of the extraordinary session. She won 71 of the votes, while 11 votes were declared invalid, and was subsequently sworn in for a five-year term later that day, becoming Kosovo's second female president. Osmani said that she hoped to normalize relations between Kosovo and Serbia, while also calling for Belgrade to apologize for the war that led to Kosovo's declaration of independence and to prosecute those who had committed war crimes.

Before taking the oath of office, Osmani resigned from the leadership of Guxo. Newly appointed Minister of Foreign Affairs Donika Gërvalla replaced her as Guxo's head.

Official visits 

The number of visits per country where President Osmani traveled as per 18 February 2023 are:
 One visit to Bulgaria, Canada, Costa Rica, Estonia, France, Greece, Iceland, Italy, Japan, Lithuania, North Macedonia, Malta, Montenegro, Panama, Portugal, Qatar, Singapore, Thailand, Tunisia, Vatican City and the United Kingdom
 Two visits to Austria, Belgium, Czech Republic and Switzerland
 Three visits to Albania, Slovenia and Turkey
 Four visits to Germany
 Five visits to United States of America

Awards 
During Osmani's master's studies at the University of Pittsburgh, the university presented her with the Excellence for the Future Award twice. In 2017, the University of Pittsburgh Center for International Studies awarded her the Sheth International Young Alumni Achievement Award for her contribution to democracy and human rights.

On 28 February 2022, Osmani was awarded a Honoris Causa from Ankara University.

Personal life 
In 2012, Osmani married Prindon Sadriu, an employee of the Ministry of Foreign Affairs. They have twin daughters. Osmani speaks  Albanian, English, Serbo-Croatian, Spanish, and Turkish.

Bibliography 

 Monograph: "Street Children in Kosovo"; Finnish Human Rights Program in Kosovo in Three Languages (English, Albanian, Serbian), 2004
 Arbitration - A Guide for Judges and Practitioners; USAID, 2008
 Bar Exam Manual - Section on Commercial Law; co-author; UNDP and Kosovo Chamber of Advocates, 2008
 Business Law - Authorized Lectures; Riinvest University, Kosovo, 2008
 The Big Impact of a Small Program on the Development of Rule of Law in Kosovo (in "The Export of Legal Education: Promoting and Impacting Transition Countries); Ashgate, 2009
 Representing Kosovo before the International Court of Justice; Center for International Legal Education (CILE Notes), September 2010, University of Pittsburgh School of Law
 Balkans - Foreign Affairs, Politics and Socio-Cultures (co-author of section of Kosovo's Foreign Policy); EPOKA University Publications, Tirana, October 2011; 
 Kosovo's foreign policy: Five Years On (in "Political Thought: Foreign Policy and Aspects of International Diplomacy", co-author; 2011, No 43, September 2013; Konrad Adenauer Stiftung)
 The Role of Parliamentary Diplomacy in Shaping the Foreign Policy of the Republic of Kosovo; University of Pittsburgh, Law Review, except publication: FALL, 2014

Notes

References

External links 

 
 

|-

|-

|-

1982 births
Living people
21st-century women politicians
Democratic League of Kosovo politicians
Female heads of state
Kosovan lawyers
Kosovan women in politics
Kosovo Albanians
People from Mitrovica, Kosovo
Presidents of Kosovo
Chairmen of the Assembly of the Republic of Kosovo
University of Pittsburgh School of Law alumni
University of Pristina alumni
Women presidents